Grupo Desportivo Torre de Moncorvo is a Portuguese sports club from Torre de Moncorvo.

The men's football team plays in the Divisão de Honra AF Bragança. The team played on the third tier in the 2016–17 Campeonato de Portugal, but performed abysmally. Formerly the team was a mainstay on the fourth tier, the Terceira Divisão.

References

Football clubs in Portugal
Association football clubs established in 1967
1967 establishments in Portugal